The Frankfurt International School e.V. (FIS) is an English-language day school founded in 1961 in Frankfurt, but located in Oberursel, Germany.

The main campus in Oberursel consists of a Primary School campus for students in "First Steps" (Age 3) to Grade 1 and the Main Campus for Elementary School (Grades 2–5) and  Upper School (Grades 6–12). A satellite campus in Wiesbaden Naurod offers schooling for students from "First-Steps" (Age 3) to Grade 8.

Curriculum and accreditation
FIS is accredited by the "New England Association of Schools and Colleges". It is also an International Baccalaureate World School and a founding member of that organization. The school implements a curriculum based on the principles espoused in the IB Primary Years Program and International Baccalaureate Diploma Program.

Subjects taught include, but are not limited to, Business, Computer Science, Design and Technology, Economics, Geography, History, Mathematics, Psychology, Physics, Visual Arts, Music, Global Politics, and Theater.

The school offers language instruction in English, French, German, Japanese, Korean, Dutch and Spanish.

Faculty and staff
The school employs faculty and staff from over 70 countries. The head of the school is Dr. Paul Fochtman.

Facilities and technology
The facilities cover  in Oberursel, Germany and feature a historic administration building (known as "Old Main"), and the three separate divisional school buildings. The main campus has two all-weather sports fields and several playgrounds.

Extracurricular activities

Sports 
The school's sports teams compete in ISST and SCIS tournaments for basketball, tennis, soccer, baseball, softball and volleyball.

REAL (Recreation, Enrichment, and Learning) program 
FIS has an after-school program known as REAL (Recreation, Enrichment, and Learning). Within the REAL Program, students can enroll in music, dance, or language courses, participate in sports or martial arts, sharpen their STEM skills or join our supervised Kids Club playgroups. Parents can participate, too – whether it's learning German or starting a new physical fitness routine – and classes are offered both during the day and into the evening. With more than 200 course offerings each year, the REAL Program provides yet another opportunity for FIS community members to pursue their passion and meet others. The REAL Program runs three separate terms per year; each is approximately 8-10 weeks in length. An online brochure is published prior to the start of each term with comprehensive information about the courses offered.

The Arts 
FIS allows students to take part in many non-athletic activities in the performing arts, student groups, and various charitable projects. Notably, the school offers the opportunity for students to audition for the AMIS program, which hosts annual festivals for band, orchestra, jazz band and choir at different international schools.

References

External links
FIS website

International Baccalaureate schools in Germany
International schools in Hesse